John Baptist Wang Jin (April 22, 1924 – September 23, 2014) was a Catholic bishop.

Born in China, Wang Jin was ordained a priest on June 19, 1951. On August 14, 1999, he was consecrated bishop of the Roman Catholic Diocese of Yuci.

References

1924 births
2014 deaths
21st-century Roman Catholic bishops in China
Chinese Roman Catholic bishops